Edward Glass may refer to:

Edward Brown Glass (1913–1995), Anglican priest and archdeacon on Isle of Man
Edward Francis Glass (1885–1954), architect in California

See also
Glass (surname)